Albert A. Dye (November 27, 1845 – November 24, 1934) was mayor of Madison, Wisconsin. He held the office from 1896 to 1897. Dye's daughter married Herbert H. Manson, the future chairman of the Democratic Party of Wisconsin.

References

Mayors of Madison, Wisconsin
1845 births
1934 deaths